Ceaușescu's speech of 21 August 1968 was a public address by Nicolae Ceaușescu, General Secretary of the Romanian Communist Party and President of the State Council of Romania, strongly condemning the Warsaw Pact invasion of Czechoslovakia. On the night of 20–21 August 1968, five Warsaw Pact nations (the Soviet Union, Bulgaria, Hungary, East Germany, and Poland) invaded Czechoslovakia in an effort to quell the reformist ideology of Alexander Dubček, the First Secretary of the Communist Party of Czechoslovakia.

On 21 August, in what became one of his most famous speeches, Ceaușescu boldly denounced the invasion in a public address before 100,000 people in Palace Square in Bucharest, and he declared that it was a "grave error and constituted a serious danger to peace in Europe and for the prospects of world socialism". His address was perceived as a bold gesture of disobedience to the Soviet Union both at home and abroad. The speech was part of the Romanian government's efforts since 1956 to assert its independence vis-à-vis Moscow.

Ceaușescu's response consolidated Romania's independent voice in the next two decades, especially since Ceaușescu encouraged the population to take up arms to meet any similar maneuver in the country. He received an enthusiastic initial response, with many people being willing to enroll in the newly-formed paramilitary Patriotic Guards.

Threat of a Soviet Invasion 
As Moscow wasn't happy about this speech, and with Khrushchev fearing that a situation like in Czechoslovakia may happen, the Soviet response was unclear. But as the Ceaușescu speech showed the West that Romania and Ceaușescu were the only reasonable communist state in the Soviet Bloc, the United States alongside with China declared their support for Romania, thus destroying any change for Moscow to launch an invasion. But even after this, Khrushchev still criticized Nicolae Ceaușescu’s actions.

See also
 We will bury you

References

External links
 Excerpts of Ceaușescu's 1968 speech (with English subtitles) 

Socialist Republic of Romania
Speeches by heads of state
Socialist realism
Censorship in Romania
1968 in Romania
Nicolae Ceaușescu
Warsaw Pact invasion of Czechoslovakia
Romania–Soviet Union relations
August 1968 events in Europe
1968 speeches